Kenneth Jerome Holmes (born October 24, 1973) is a former American football defensive end in the National Football League.  He was drafted by the Tennessee Oilers 18th overall in the 1997 NFL Draft.  He played college football at Miami.

Holmes also played for the New York Giants.

College career
In 1992, Holmes was awarded an athletic scholarship by the University of Miami where he completed a bachelor's degree in liberal arts. While at the University of Miami, Holmes was a two-time first-team All-Big East selection, gracing the cover of Sports Illustrated. During his four years as a Hurricane, he also served two consecutive terms as the captain for the football program and totaled 29 sacks and 207 tackles for his career. In 1996–97 Holmes had a career high of 11.5 sacks, ranking second in all-time sacks for at Miami at the time.

Professional career
Holmes was drafted in the first round of the 1997 NFL Draft by the Tennessee Oilers and help lead the Titans to their first and only Super Bowl XXXIV. In 2001, he signed as a free agent with the New York Giants.

After an outstanding collegiate career at the University of Miami, Kenny became the Tennessee Oilers first round (18th overall selection) pick in the 1997 NFL Draft. Holmes, a quick, agile, player with powerful hands, became known for his ability to pressure the quarterback and punish blockers while firing into the back field rushing the quarterback. As the franchise's first draft choice in its inaugural season, Kenny lived up to expectations by tying for team leads in sacks and ultimately demonstrated why he was considered one of the most promising Defensive Ends in the National Football League (NFL). As a result of his performance, he was selected for the All Rookie team. He also recorded a forced fumble in 4 consecutive games in 2000. In 1999, the Titans made it to Super Bowl XXXIV in which Holmes started on the number one ranked defense in the NFL. During the 2001 season, Holmes and Jevon Kearse made up the bookends that led the NFL in total sacks and defense. Among his many accomplishments and awards as a Titan, Holmes received the ED Block Courage Award in 2000 and the Titans Man of the Year Award in 2001. After completing his contract with the Tennessee Titans, Holmes signed as a Free Agent with the New York Giants and partnered with Michael Strahan to lead the team to the playoffs in 2003. He recorded 38.5 sacks in seven NFL seasons.

Coaching career
Holmes was the defensive line coach at the University of Idaho from 2015 to 2016.

References

1973 births
Living people
American football defensive ends
FIU Panthers football coaches
Idaho Vandals football coaches
Miami Hurricanes football players
New Mexico State Aggies football coaches
New York Giants players
San Diego Toreros football coaches
Tennessee Oilers players
Tennessee Titans players
High school football coaches in Florida
Junior college football coaches in the United States
People from Indian River County, Florida
People from Vero Beach, Florida
Players of American football from Florida
Vero Beach High School alumni
Ed Block Courage Award recipients